Tathoi Deb (born Sharanya Deb) is an Indian actress, dancer and television presenter. She is one of the most popular former child actresses in Bengali cinema.

Biography
Tathoi was born in Kolkata, West Bengal to Late Lala Biswajit Deb and Jamuna Deb. She has lost her father at an early age, so she lives with her mother. She has two older brothers Biswarup & Biswaraj. She attended National Gems Higher Secondary School.

Career
Tathoi Deb's first job at TV was hosting the junior version of Bengali television dance reality show Dance Bangla Dance on Zee Bangla together with Aritra. Veteran Bengali actor Mithun Chakraborty was the judge of the show, which was broadcast for two seasons and made her a household name. She has won the highest television award in Bengali channels: a Telesamman Award for her presenting in this show. Tathoi, Aritra and Mithun Chakraborty had also presented a new dance show titled Dhoom Dhamaka which contains both junior and senior contestants.

She received the coveted Sanjukta Panigrahi Award for her dancing at the age of 8 and was also awarded the Amazing Kid Entertainer award at the Pogo Amazing Kids Awards (PAKA) 2008. She received the award from Bollywood actress Deepika Padukone. 

Tathoi has also performed versatile roles in various Bengali movies and telefilms. In Neel Rajar Deshe by Riingo she was the female lead. Tathoi is a trained Odissi dancer and have been trained by Dona Ganguly, the wife of Former Indian cricket team captain Sourav Ganguly.

Tathoi has been part of National Award-winning film Shob Choritro Kalponik by Rituporno Ghosh where she played cameo of young Radhika (Bipasha Basu). Tathoi's performance in Chalo Paltai (2011) was praised by all and sundry.
 She won the Best Child Artist award from Reliance Big Bangla New Talent Awards in 2011 for her performance in Chalo Paltai. In January 2012, Tathoi starred in Khokababu, the second highest-grossing Tollywood film of the time. Khokababu is Tathoi's most successful film till date commercially. Tathoi's acting was appreciated by fans and critics in her last film Ek Phonta Bhalobasha opposite Indraneil Sengupta which released in July 2013.

Besides acting, she has endorsed several brands like Elite Footwear, Meghna Garments, Itsy Bitsy Biscuits, Hahnemann Food products.She has also hosted and acted in different TV shows since Dance Bangla Dance Junior. She returned to Dance Bangla Dance season 8 in 2014 as a celebrity participant and was the winner.

Filmography
Akai Aksho (2005)
Deshodrohi (stuck/on hold)
Priyotoma (2006)
Agnipariksha (2006)
Chander Bari (2007)
Nawab Nandini (2007)
Neel Rajar Deshe (2008)
Aamar Pratigna (2008)
Shibaji (2008)
Sob Choritro Kalponik (2009)
Prem Amar (2009)
Chalo Paltai  (2011)
Khokababu (2012)
Ek Fota Bhaalobasha (2013)

Other shows
Dance Bangla Dance Junior
Take a Break
Dhoom Dhamaka
Dhay Dhamaal
Ek Poloke Ektu Dekha(Megaserial)
Joto Hashi Toto Ranna

Awards and nominations

Sambad Pratidin Telesamman
Winner
2008: Best Female Anchor (Dance Bangla Dance Junior)

POGO Amazing Kids Awards(PAKA)
Winner
2008: Best Entertainer

Big Bangla New Talent Awards
Winner
2011: Best Child Artist (Chalo Paltai)

Uttam Kala Ratna Award
Winner
2012

See also
 Devdaan Bhowmik
 Aritra Dutta Banik

Further reading
Child celebs on Children’s day at KolkataMirror.com, 15 November 2008. Retrieved 17 December 2008.
‘I got the film even without an audition’, The Times of India, interview with Devdaan Bhowmik.

References

External links 

www.gomolo.in Tathoi Deb
connect.in.com Tathoi Deb
 Official Facebook Page: Log into Facebook

Actresses from Kolkata
Indian film actresses
Living people
21st-century Indian child actresses
Actresses in Bengali cinema
Child actresses in Bengali cinema
21st-century Indian actresses
Year of birth missing (living people)